Wolfgang Schweickard (born 16 October 1954 in Aschaffenburg) is a German Romance studies scholar and lexicographer.

His main research areas are history of Romance languages and lexicography. He is co-editor of the Zeitschrift für romanische Philologie and the yearbook Lexicographica. Current projects are the Deonomasticon Italicum (DI), the Lessico etimologico italiano (LEI) (together with Max Pfister) and the Dictionnaire étymologique des langues romanes (DÉRom) (together with Éva Buchi).

References

External links
 
 Wolfgang Schweickard - Universität des Saarlandes

1954 births
Living people
People from Aschaffenburg
Linguists from Germany
Grammarians of Italian
Academic staff of Saarland University
Academic staff of the University of Jena
Romance philologists
German lexicographers
German male non-fiction writers